Altavista High School is a public high school in Altavista, Virginia, United States. Altavista High School and Middle School are under the same roof and, thus, go by the name Altavista Combined School (Grades 6–12). The current enrollment is estimated to be 700 students (6–12). The mascot is the Colonel, and their teams are known as "The Colonels." The school is a member of VHSL and competes with the Group A Dogwood District.

A notable alumnus of Altavista Combined School is Juan Thornhill, Safety for the Kansas City Chiefs and Superbowl LIV Champion.

Athletics

Division A state championship titles:
 Football: 2009, 2013, 2014
 Volleyball: 2002
 Boys Cross Country: 2010
 Boys Basketball: 2004, 2013, 2014, 2015
 Girls Basketball: 2004
 Softball: 2009

Organizations

Forensics 
Numerous state titles.

Nuntius yearbook
VHSL Trophy Class
Columbia Scholastic Press Association Silver Crown
Columbia Scholastic Press Association Gold Crown
National Scholastic Press Association Pacemaker Finalist

References

External links
AltaVista Combined School

Public high schools in Virginia
Schools in Campbell County, Virginia